Carex scirpoidea is a species of sedge belonging to the family Cyperaceae. It is dioecious, with male and female flowers on separate plants.

Its native range is Norway (Solvågtind), Russia (Siberia and  far eastern Russia), Greenland, Canada and the US.

References

scirpoidea
Dioecious plants
Flora of Greenland